In enzymology, a streptomycin 3"-adenylyltransferase is an enzyme that catalyzes the chemical reaction:

ATP + streptomycin  diphosphate + 3"-adenylylstreptomycin

Thus, the two substrates of this enzyme are ATP and streptomycin, whereas its two products are diphosphate and 3''-adenylylstreptomycin.

This enzyme belongs to the family of transferases, specifically those transferring phosphorus-containing nucleotide groups (nucleotidyltransferases).  The systematic name of this enzyme class is ATP:streptomycin 3"-adenylyltransferase. Other names in common use include streptomycin adenylate synthetase, streptomycin adenyltransferase, streptomycin adenylylase, streptomycin adenylyltransferase, streptomycin-spectinomycin adenylyltransferase, AAD (3"), and aminoglycoside 3"-adenylyltransferase.

References

 

EC 2.7.7
Enzymes of unknown structure